Mark Howe Murphy (March 14, 1932 – October 22, 2015) was an American jazz singer based at various times in New York City, Los Angeles, London, and San Francisco. He recorded 51 albums under his own name during his lifetime and was principally known for his innovative vocal improvisations. He was the recipient of the 1996, 1997, 2000, and 2001 Down Beat magazine readers' jazz poll for Best Male Vocalist and was also nominated five times for the Grammy Award for Best Vocal Jazz Performance. He wrote lyrics to the jazz tunes "Stolen Moments" and "Red Clay".

Early life
Born in Syracuse, New York, in 1932, Murphy was raised in a musical family, his parents having met when his father was appointed director of the local Methodist Church choir. He grew up in the nearby small town of Fulton, New York, where his grandmother and then his aunt were the church organists. Opera was also a presence in the Murphy home. He started piano lessons at the age of seven.

In his teens, Murphy joined his brother Dwight's jazz dance band as the singer (and occasional pianist), influenced by Peggy Lee, Nat "King" Cole, June Christy, Anita O'Day, and Ella Fitzgerald. The Jazz pianist Art Tatum was another early influence.

Murphy graduated from Syracuse University in 1953, having majored in Music and Drama. Whilst there he was spotted singing at the Embassy Club by Sammy Davis Jr, who invited him to perform a guest spot at his own gig shortly afterwards, and put him in touch with TV host Steve Allen.

The following year Murphy moved to New York City, taking part-time jobs as he looked for work as an actor and singer. He appeared in productions for the Gilbert and Sullivan Light Opera Company and a musical version for television of Casey at the Bat. He also twice took second place at Apollo Theatre amateur singing contests.

The first albums
Murphy was eventually introduced to record producer Milt Gabler, who was an artist and repertoire director (A&R) for Decca. His resulting debut recording was Meet Mark Murphy (1956), followed closely by Let Yourself Go (1957).

After disappointing album sales, in 1958 Murphy moved to Los Angeles, where he recorded three albums for Capitol Records, and had a minor hit single with "This Could Be the Start of Something". But this was not enough for him to be retained by Capitol, so he returned to New York in the early '60s. Here he recorded two albums for Riverside Records: the album Rah (1961) included "Angel Eyes", a version of Horace Silver's "Doodlin'", and "Green Dolphin Street", featuring Bill Evans, Clark Terry, Urbie Green, Blue Mitchell and Wynton Kelly as accompanists. His favorite recording to date, That's How I Love the Blues, soon followed. In 1963, Murphy hit the charts across the country with his single of "Fly Me to the Moon" and was voted New Star of the Year in Down Beat Magazine's Reader's Poll. Around this time he fell under the spell of Miles Davis, and for the rest of his career maintained that he tried as far as possible to sing like Miles played.

London
In 1963 Murphy moved to London, England, where he quickly found acceptance and played frequently at Ronnie Scott's Club, as well as making regular appearances on BBC Radio. He recorded three more albums in London, and one in Germany that is amongst his best - Midnight Mood (1968). From London he made frequent trips to Holland, where he worked on Dutch radio, mainly with producer Joop de Roo. Between 1964 and 1972 he acted in a number of drama productions for TV and radio, and appeared as a singer in the 1967 British comedy film Just Like a Woman. Meanwhile he continued to cultivate his jazz audiences in Europe, singing in clubs and on radio. It was in London that Murphy, who was gay, met his long-time partner Eddie O'Sullivan.

The Muse years
He returned to the States in 1972 and began recording an average of an album per year for more than 14 years on the Muse label. These included the Grammy-nominated albums Satisfaction Guaranteed, Bop for Kerouac and Nat's Choice: Nat King Cole Songbook Vol. II. Murphy's other highly regarded Muse recordings include Bridging a Gap (featuring Ron Carter, Jimmy Madison, Randy Brecker and Michael Brecker), Mark Murphy Sings (again featuring the Brecker Brothers along with David Sanborn), Living Room, Beauty And the Beast and Stolen Moments. Bop for Kerouac (1981), with Richie Cole and Bill Mays, was a result of Murphy's enthusiasm for the writing of Jack Kerouac, whom Murphy regarded as a soul-mate. It included readings from the author's books On the Road and The Subterraneans. Murphy followed it up with Kerouac Then And Now, released in 1989. Having been a fan of Brazilian music since the late 1950s, in 1984 together with the band Viva Brasil he recorded the album Brazil Song (Cancões do Brasil), which featured work by Antonio Carlos Jobim and Milton Nascimento. He wrote lyrics for the title track, by Oliver Nelson, of his Stolen Moments album, and it quickly became a radio favourite, remaining one of his most popular recordings.

New directions
In 1987, Murphy continued his explorations of Brazilian music by recording Night Mood, an album of songs by composer Ivan Lins, followed by the Grammy-nominated September Ballads - both on Milestone Records.

In the UK Murphy's recorded output gained a new lease of life in the mid-Eighties during the acid jazz dance craze. DJ's, principally Gilles Peterson, played his bop and latin recordings at club nights, creating a new generation of Mark Murphy fans. He continued to work extensively in Europe, recording in Germany, Holland, Austria, England, Italy, France, Sweden, Denmark and Slovenia, often as a guest artist. Murphy also appeared on UFO's last two releases (for Polydor Records), in which he wrote and rapped lyrics on songs composed with the group. This collaboration opened up further new audiences in the acid-jazz and hip-hop genres, demonstrating jazz's timelessness while transcending generations and styles.

In August 1997, BMG/RCA Victor released Song For The Geese, for which he received his fifth and final Grammy nomination. In that same month, the 32 Records label released a double CD anthology Stolen and Other Moments, which features some of his recordings for the now defunct Muse label. The CD features material from the two "Kerouac" albums and a selection of "the best of Mark Murphy". It was followed by three further anthologies.

After Muse boss Joe Fields sold the label and set up HighNote Records in its place, Murphy recorded five more albums for the new label, including Some Time Ago (2000), Links (2001) and Memories of You (2003).

Murphy's release Once to Every Heart (2005) on Verve, features sensuous ballads, where the listener can hear him singing at the top of his form, with an orchestra arranged by Nan Schwartz. It was one of the best-selling albums of Murphy's career. In 2007 Verve released Love is What Stays. Both albums were produced by German trumpeter Till Brönner.

Murphy also collaborated with Tenth & Parker, a modern UK electronica/acid jazz group on their Twenty:Twelve (2001) album; plus the Five Corners Quintet, a modern Finnish jazz band, appearing on their albums Chasin' the Jazz Gone By (2005) and Hot Corner (2008).

In 2010 he released the independently produced CD, Never Let Me Go, accompanied by pianist Misha Piatigorsky, bassist Danton Boller and drummer Chris Wabich. The CD contains all songs he selected, mostly ballads, and was the first time he recorded Bill Evans' "Turn Out The Stars".

Murphy also participated as a guest on The Royal Bopsters Project by Amy London, Darmon Meader, Dylan Pramuk, and Holli Ross, recorded in 2012 and released in 2015 by Motema Music. His final recording was a limited edition EP/MP3, A Beautiful Friendship: Remembering Shirley Horn on Gearbox Records, released in 2013.

Murphy continued to tour internationally into his 80s, appearing at festivals and concerts, in jazz clubs and on television programs, throughout the U.S., Europe, Australia and Japan and elsewhere. John Bush at AllMusic.com described Murphy as "a major name in vocal jazz." A longtime resident of the Lillian Booth Actors Home in Englewood, New Jersey, he died there on October 22, 2015.

Discography

As leader
 1956 Meet Mark Murphy (Decca)
 1957 Let Yourself Go (Decca)
 1959 This Could Be the Start of Something (Capitol)
 1960 Mark Murphy's Hip Parade (Capitol)
 1960 Playing the Field (Capitol)
 1961 Rah (Riverside)
 1962 That's How I Love the Blues! (Riverside)
 1965 Swingin' Singin' Affair (Fontana)
 1966 Who Can I Turn To & 11 Other Great Standards (Immediate)
 1968 Midnight Mood (Saba)
 1970 This Must Be Earth (Phoenix)
 1972 Bridging a Gap (Muse)
 1973 Mark II (Muse)
 1975 Mark Murphy Sings...On the Red Clay, Naima and Other Great Songs (Muse)
 1977 Mark Murphy Sings Mostly Dorothy Fields & Cy Coleman (Audiophile)
 1978 Stolen Moments (Muse)
 1979 Satisfaction Guaranteed (Muse)
 1981 Bop for Kerouac (Muse)
 1982 The Artistry of Mark Murphy (Muse)
 1983 Brazil Song (Cancões Do Brasil) (Muse)
 1983 Mark Murphy Sings the Nat King Cole Songbook, Volume One (Muse)
 1983 Mark Murphy Sings Nat's Choice: The Nat King Cole Songbook, Volume Two (Muse)
 1984 Living Room (Muse)
 1986 Beauty and the Beast (Muse)
 1986 Kerouac, Then and Now (Muse)
 1987 Night Mood: The Music of Ivan Lins (Milestone)
 1988 September Ballads (Milestone)
 1990 What a Way to Go (Muse)
 1991 I'll Close My Eyes (Muse)
 1991 One for Junior (Muse)
 1993 Very Early  (West and East Music)
 1993 Just Jazz (Jazzette)
 1995 The Dream (Jive)
 1996 Shadows (TCB Music)
 1996 North Sea Jazz Sessions, Volume 5 (Jazz World)
 1997 Song for the Geese (RCA Victor)
 1999 Some Time Ago (HighNote)
 2000 The Latin Porter (Go Jazz)
 2000 Links (HighNote)
 2001 Lucky to Be Me (HighNote)
 2003 Memories of You: Remembering Joe Williams (HighNote)
 2004 Bop for Miles (HighNote)
 2004 Dim the Lights  (Millennium)
 2005 Once to Every Heart (Verve)
 2006 Love Is What Stays (Verve)
 2010 Never Let Me Go (Mark Murphy Productions)
 2013 A Beautiful Friendship: Remembering Shirley Horn (Gearbox)
 2013 Another Vision (Edel)
 2016  Live In Athens, Greece  (Harbinger)
 2016  Live In Italy 2001 (Splasch)
 2017  Wild And Free: Live at the Keystone Korner (HighNote)

Guest appearances
With Madeline Eastman
 1991 "You're the Dangerous Type" – from Mad About Madeline! (Mad Kat)
With Till Brönner
 2002 "Dim the Lights" – from Blue Eyed Soul (Universal)
With Gill Manly
 2009 "I Keep Goin' Back to Joe's" – from With a Song in My Heart (Linn)
With Guillaume de Chassy and Daniel Yvinec
 2009 "I'll Walk Alone"/"Then I'll Be Tired of You"/"Taking a Chance on Love"/"I Wish You Love" – from Songs from the Last Century (Bee Jazz)
With The Five Corners Quintet
 2005 "This Could Be the Start of Something"/"Before We Say Goodbye"/"Jamming (with Mr. Hoagland)" - from Chasin' the Jazz Gone By (Ricky-Tick Records)
 2008 "Kerouac Days in Montana"/"Come and Get Me"/"Layers of Layers" – from Hot Corner (Ricky-Tick Records)

Videos
 2008 Mark Murphy: Murphy's Mood – with Pete Candoli and Conte Candoli

References

External links

1932 births
2015 deaths
American expatriates in England
American jazz singers
American gay musicians
American gay actors
Gay singers
Gay songwriters
LGBT people from New York (state)
American LGBT singers
American LGBT songwriters
Milestone Records artists
Muse Records artists
People from Englewood, New Jersey
Musicians from Syracuse, New York
People from Fulton, Oswego County, New York
Riverside Records artists
Swing singers
Verve Records artists
Vocalese singers
Jazz musicians from New York (state)
American male jazz musicians
Methodists from New York (state)
Syracuse University alumni
HighNote Records artists
20th-century American male singers
21st-century American male singers